Flood control (or flood management or flood protection) methods are used to reduce or prevent the detrimental effects of flood waters. Flood relief methods are used to reduce the effects of flood waters or high water levels. Flooding can be caused by a mix of both natural processes, such as extreme weather upstream, and human changes to waterbodies and runoff. Though building hard infrastructure to prevent flooding, such as flood walls, can be effective at managing flooding, increased best practice within landscape engineering is to rely more on soft infrastructure and natural systems, such as marshes and flood plains, for handling the increase in water.  For flooding on coasts, coastal management practices have to not only handle changes water flow, but also natural processes like tides.

Flood control and relief is a particularly important part of climate change adaptation and climate resilience, both sea level rise and changes in the weather (climate change causes more intense and quicker rainfall), means that flooding of human infrastructure is particularly important the world over.

Causes of flooding 

Floods are caused by many factors or a combination of any of these generally prolonged heavy rainfall (locally concentrated or throughout a catchment area), highly accelerated snowmelt, severe winds over water, unusual high tides, tsunamis, or failure of dams, levees, retention ponds, or other structures that retained the water. Flooding can be exacerbated by increased amounts of impervious surface or by other natural hazards such as wildfires, which reduce the supply of vegetation that can absorb rainfall.

Periodic floods occur on many rivers, forming a surrounding region known as the flood plain.

During times of rain, some of the water is retained in ponds or soil, some is absorbed by grass and vegetation, some evaporates, and the rest travels over the land as surface runoff. Floods occur when ponds, lakes, riverbeds, soil, and vegetation cannot absorb all the water. This has been exacerbated by human activities such as draining wetlands that naturally store large amounts of water and building paved surfaces that do not absorb any water. Water then runs off the land in quantities that cannot be carried within stream channels or retained in natural ponds, lakes, and man-made reservoirs. About 30 percent of all precipitation becomes runoff and that amount might be increased by water from melting snow.  River flooding is often caused by heavy rain, sometimes increased by melting snow. A flood that rises rapidly, with little or no warning, is called a flash flood. Flash floods usually result from intense rainfall over a relatively small area, or if the area was already saturated from previous precipitation.

Even when rainfall is relatively light, the shorelines of lakes and bays can be flooded by severe winds—such as during hurricanes—that blow water into the shore areas.

Coastal areas are sometimes flooded by unusually high tides, such as spring tides, especially when compounded by high winds and storm surges. This was the cause of the North Sea flood of 1953 which flooded large swathes of the Netherlands and the East coast of England and which remains the greatest recorded natural disaster in England.

Effects of floods 

Flooding has many impacts. It damages property and endangers the lives of humans and other species. Rapid water runoff causes soil erosion and concomitant sediment deposition elsewhere (such as further downstream or down a coast). The spawning grounds for fish and other wildlife habitats can become polluted or completely destroyed. Some prolonged high floods can delay traffic in areas which lack elevated roadways. Floods can interfere with drainage and economical use of lands, such as interfering with farming. Structural damage can occur in bridge abutments, bank lines, sewer lines, and other structures within floodways. Waterway navigation and hydroelectric power are often impaired. Financial losses due to floods are typically millions of dollars each year, with the worst floods in recent U.S. history having cost billions of dollars.

Benefits of flooding 
There are many disruptive effects of flooding on human settlements and economic activities. However, flooding can bring benefits, such as making the soil more fertile and providing it with more nutrients. Periodic flooding was essential to the well-being of ancient communities along the Tigris-Euphrates Rivers, the Nile River, the Indus River, the Ganges and the Yellow River, among others.  The viability for hydrologically based renewable sources of energy is higher in flood-prone regions.

Methods of flood management 

Some methods of flood control have been practiced since ancient times. These methods include planting vegetation to retain extra water, terracing hillsides to slow flow downhill, and the construction of floodways (man-made channels to divert floodwater). Other techniques include the construction of levees, lakes, dams, reservoirs, retention ponds to hold extra water during times of flooding.

Coastal management

Dams 

Many dams and their associated reservoirs are designed completely or partially to aid in flood protection and control. Many large dams have flood-control reservations in which the level of a reservoir must be kept below a certain elevation before the onset of the rainy/summer melt season to allow a certain amount of space in which floodwaters can fill. Other beneficial uses of dam created reservoirs include hydroelectric power generation, water conservation, and recreation. Reservoir and dam construction and design is based upon standards, typically set out by the government. In the United States, dam and reservoir design is regulated by the US Army Corps of Engineers (USACE). Design of a dam and reservoir follows guidelines set by the USACE and covers topics such as design flow rates in consideration to meteorological, topographic, streamflow, and soil data for the watershed above the structure.

The term dry dam refers to a dam that serves purely for flood control without any conservation storage (e.g. Mount Morris Dam, Seven Oaks Dam).

Diversion canals

Floodplains and groundwater replenishment 
Excess water can be used for groundwater replenishment by diversion onto land that can absorb the water. This technique can reduce the impact of later droughts by using the ground as a natural reservoir.  It is being used in California, where orchards and vineyards can be flooded without damaging crops, or in other places wilderness areas have been re-engineered to act as floodplains.

River defenses 
In many countries, rivers are prone to floods and are often carefully managed. Defenses such as levees, bunds, reservoirs, and weirs are used to prevent rivers from bursting their banks. A weir, also known as a lowhead dam, is most often used to create millponds, but on the Humber River in Toronto, a weir was built near Raymore Drive to prevent a recurrence of the flood damage caused by Hurricane Hazel in October 1954.

The Leeds flood alleviation scheme uses movable weirs which are lowered during periods of high water to reduce the chances of flooding upstream. Two such weirs, the first in the UK, were installed on the River Aire in October 2017 at Crown Point, Leeds city centre and Knostrop. The Knostrop weir was operated during the 2019 England floods. They are designed to reduce potential flood levels by up to one metre.

Coastal defenses 
Coastal flooding has been addressed with coastal defenses, such as sea walls, beach nourishment, and barrier islands.

Tide gates are used in conjunction with dykes and culverts. They can be placed at the mouth of streams or small rivers, where an estuary begins or where tributary streams, or drainage ditches connect to sloughs. Tide gates close during incoming tides to prevent tidal waters from moving upland, and open during outgoing tides to allow waters to drain out via the culvert and into the estuary side of the dike. The opening and closing of the gates is driven by a difference in water level on either side of the gate.

Living Breakwaters Case Study

The Living Breakwaters initiative is the result of an Obama-era competition for innovative designs to prevent further flooding in coastal communities during harsh weather conditions.

In October 2012, Hurricane Sandy hit the east coast of the United States causing more than $65 billion in damages and economic loss. One of the areas that got hit hardest was Staten Island's South Shore where the beach community of Tottenville saw sixteen-foot waves that destroyed homes and killed two residents (Dejean).

In response to the devastation, the Department of Housing and Urban Development created the Hurricane Sandy Rebuilding Task Force to develop "implementable solutions to the region's most complex needs (Hurricane Sandy Design Competition)." Shortly after its formation, the task force introduced Rebuild by Design, a competition that promised a total of $920 million from the Community Block Disaster Recovery program for the winners to implement their plans (Tottenville Shoreline Protection Project). Ten teams submitted designs and six of them were eventually awarded funding for their respective projects.

One winning design was the Living Breakwaters initiative proposed by landscape architect Kate Orff. Her firm, SCAPE, envisioned what Orff describes as a "living piece of infrastructure" including a barrier that protrudes from the water and houses an oyster reef (Dejean). SCAPE's green infrastructure solution will be implemented in three stages beginning in Tottenville, subsequently expanding to the surrounding areas, and to be completed in 2021 (Melcher). The plan aims to protect the South Shore of Staten Island from future storm damage, employing oysters to purify the water and restore the coastline. They claim that the breakwaters will protect the coastline from the intense storm conditions caused by climate change and the wave protection will reduce erosion which has greatly contributed to habitat loss in the area (Dejean).

The living breakwaters, however, are not going to exist in an isolated system. SCAPE's design is a part of a layered approach that includes partnerships with the Billion Oyster Project and the Tottenville Shoreline Protection Project, a separately funded project to build similar shoreline protection structures. In addition, part of the Living Breakwaters project's funding is allocated for establishing a "learning hub" to inform local communities about the benefits of oysters and protecting the shoreline ecosystem (Hurricane Sandy Design Competition). This information hopes to encourage residents of Tottenville the surrounding areas to practice sustainable habits, prevent pollution, and continue to engage with the project in the future.

Self-closing flood barrier 
The self-closing flood barrier (SCFB) is a flood defense system designed to protect people and property from inland waterway floods caused by heavy rainfall, gales, or rapid melting snow.  The SCFB can be built to protect residential properties and whole communities, as well as industrial or other strategic areas. The barrier system is constantly ready to deploy in a flood situation, it can be installed in any length and uses the rising flood water to deploy.

Temporary perimeter barriers 

When permanent defenses fail, emergency measures such as sandbags or inflatable impermeable sacks are used.

In 1988, a method of using water to control flooding was discovered. This was accomplished by containing 2 parallel tubes within a third outer tube. When filled, this structure formed a non-rolling wall of water that can control 80 percent of its height in external water depth, with dry ground behind it. Eight foot tall water filled barriers were used to surround Fort Calhoun Nuclear Generating Station during the 2011 Missouri River Flooding. Instead of trucking in sandbag material for a flood, stacking it, then trucking it out to a hazmat disposal site, flood control can be accomplished by using the on site water. However, these are not fool proof.

In 1999, a group of Norwegian engineers patented a transportable, removable, and reusable flood barrier which uses the water's weight against itself. This removable flood panels protect cities and public utilities.

Other solutions, such as HydroSack, are polypropylene exteriors with wood pulp within, though they are one-time use.

Hazard reduction

Strategic retreat

One way of reducing the damage caused by flooding is to remove buildings from flood-prone areas, leaving them as parks or returning them to wilderness. Floodplain buyout programs have been operated in places like New Jersey (both before and after Hurricane Sandy), Charlotte, North Carolina, and Missouri.

In the United States, FEMA produces flood insurance rate maps that identify areas of future risk, enabling local governments to apply zoning regulations to prevent or minimize property damage.

Resilience

Buildings and other urban infrastructure can be designed so that even if a flood does happen, the city can recover quickly and costs are minimized. For example, homes can be put on stilts, electrical and HVAC equipment can be put on the roof instead of in the basement, and subway entrances and tunnels can have built-in movable water barriers. New York City began a substantial effort to plan and build for flood resilience after Hurricane Sandy.

Flood control by continent

North America 
An elaborate system of flood way defenses can be found in the Canadian province of Manitoba. The Red River flows northward from the United States, passing through the city of Winnipeg (where it meets the Assiniboine River) and into Lake Winnipeg. As is the case with all north-flowing rivers in the temperate zone of the Northern Hemisphere, snow melt in southern sections may cause river levels to rise before northern sections have had a chance to completely thaw. This can lead to devastating flooding, as occurred in Winnipeg during the spring of 1950. To protect the city from future floods, the Manitoba government undertook the construction of a massive system of diversions, dikes, and flood ways (including the Red River Floodway and the Portage Diversion). The system kept Winnipeg safe during the 1997 flood which devastated many communities upriver from Winnipeg, including Grand Forks, North Dakota and Ste. Agathe, Manitoba.

In the United States, the U.S. Army Corps of Engineers is the lead flood control agency. After Hurricane Sandy, New York City's Metropolitan Transportation Authority (MTA) initiated multiple flood barrier projects to protect the transit assets in Manhattan. In one case, the MTA's New York City Transit Authority (NYCT) sealed subway entrances in lower Manhattan using a deployable fabric cover system called Flex-Gate, a system that protects the subway entrances against  of water. Extreme storm flood protection levels have been revised based on new Federal Emergency Management Agency guidelines for 100-year and 500-year design flood elevations.

In the New Orleans Metropolitan Area, 35 percent of which sits below sea level, is protected by hundreds of miles of levees and flood gates. This system failed catastrophically, with numerous breaks, during Hurricane Katrina (2005) in the city proper and in eastern sections of the Metro Area, resulting in the inundation of approximately 50 percent of the metropolitan area, ranging from a few inches to twenty feet in coastal communities.

The Morganza Spillway provides a method of diverting water from the Mississippi River when a river flood threatens New Orleans, Baton Rouge and other major cities on the lower Mississippi. It is the largest of a system of spillways and floodways along the Mississippi. Completed in 1954, the spillway has been opened twice, in 1973 and in 2011.

In an act of successful flood prevention, the federal government offered to buy out flood-prone properties in the United States in order to prevent repeated disasters after the 1993 flood across the Midwest.  Several communities accepted and the government, in partnership with the state, bought 25,000 properties which they converted into wetlands. These wetlands act as a sponge in storms and in 1995, when the floods returned, the government did not have to expend resources in those areas.

Asia 

In Kyoto, Japan, the Hata clan successfully controlled floods on the Katsura River in around 500 A.D and also constructed a sluice on the Kazuno River.

In China flood diversion areas are rural areas that are deliberately flooded in emergencies in order to protect cities.

The consequences of deforestation and changing land use on the risk and severity of flooding are subjects of discussion. In assessing the impacts of Himalayan deforestation on the Ganges-Brahmaputra Lowlands, it was found that forests would not have prevented or significantly reduced flooding in the case of an extreme weather event. However, more general or overview studies agree on the negative impacts that deforestation has on flood safety - and the positive effects of wise land use and reforestation.

Many have proposed that loss of vegetation (deforestation) will lead to an increased risk of flooding. With natural forest cover the flood duration should decrease. Reducing the rate of deforestation should improve the incidents and severity of floods.

Africa
In Egypt, both the Aswan Low Dam (1902) and the Aswan High Dam (1976) have controlled various amounts of flooding along the Nile River.

Europe

Following the misery and destruction caused by the 1910 Great Flood of Paris, the French government built a series of reservoirs called  (or Great Lakes) which helps remove pressure from the Seine during floods, especially the regular winter flooding.

London is protected from flooding by Thames Barrier, a huge mechanical barrier across the River Thames, which is raised when the water level reaches a certain point. This project has been operational since 1982 and was designed to protect against a surge of water such as the North Sea flood of 1953.

Project MOSE in Venice has a similar arrangement, although it is already unable to cope with very high tides. The defenses of both London and Venice will be rendered inadequate if sea levels continue to rise.

The largest and most elaborate flood defenses can be found in the Netherlands, where they are referred to as the Delta Works with the Oosterscheldekering as its crowning achievement. These works in the southwestern part of the country were built in response to the North Sea flood of 1953. The Dutch had already built one of the world's largest dams in the north of the country. The Afsluitdijk closing occurred in 1932.

The Saint Petersburg Dam was completed in 2008 to protect Saint Petersburg from storm surges. It also has a main traffic function, as it completes a ring road around Saint Petersburg.

Oceania 
Flooding is the greatest natural hazard in New Zealand (Aotearoa), and its control is primarily managed and funded by local councils. Throughout the country there is a network of more than 5284 km of levees, while gravel extraction to lower river water levels is also a popular flood control technique. The management of flooding in the country is shifting towards nature based solutions, such as the widening of the Hutt River channel in Wellington.

Climate change adaptation

Flood clean-up safety 
Clean-up activities following floods often pose hazards to workers and volunteers involved in the effort. Potential dangers include electrical hazards, carbon monoxide exposure, musculoskeletal hazards, heat or cold stress, motor vehicle-related dangers, fire, drowning, and exposure to hazardous materials. Because flooded disaster sites are unstable, clean-up workers might encounter sharp jagged debris, biological hazards in the flood water, exposed electrical lines, blood or other body fluids, and animal and human remains. In planning for and reacting to flood disasters, managers provide workers with hard hats, goggles, heavy work gloves, life jackets, and watertight boots with steel toes and insoles.

Development of technology 
Europe is at the forefront of the flood control technology, with low-lying countries such as the Netherlands and Belgium developing techniques that can serve as examples to other countries facing similar problems and other countries which may soon face these problems.

After Hurricane Katrina, the US state of Louisiana sent politicians to the Netherlands to take a tour of the complex and highly developed flood control system in place in the Netherlands. With a BBC article quoting experts as saying 70 percent more people will live in delta cities by 2050, the number of people impacted by a rise in sea level will greatly increase. Several approaches, from high-tech sensors detecting imminent levee failure to movable semi-circular structures closing an entire river, are being developed or used around the world. Regular maintenance of hydraulic structures, however, is another crucial part of flood control.

See also 

 Amphibious vehicle
 Disaster risk reduction
 Flash flood
 Flood barrier
 Flood wall
 Flood Control Act of 1936 (in the US)
 Hydrological Ensemble Prediction Experiment
 Hydrosacks
 Maeslantkering – Netherlands
 MOSE project – Venice
 Northern Stormwater Interceptor, Bristol (in the UK)
 Thames Barrier – London
 Tidal barrage
 Weir

References

Notes

Further reading 

 
 CNN Newsource. “Cleaning New York's Filthy Harbor with One Billion Oysters.” WTVF, January 17, 2019. https://www.newschannel5.com/news/national/cleaning-new-yorks-filthy-harbor-with-one-billion-oysters.
 Dejean, Ashley. “Five Years after Sandy, One New York Town's Flood Prevention Plans Are so 	Crazy They Just Might Work.” Mother Jones, October 27, 2017. https://www.motherjones.com/politics/2017/10/five-years-after-sandy-one-new-york-towns-flood-prevention-plans-are-so-crazy-they-just-might-work/.
 “Hurricane Sandy Design Competition.” Rebuild by Design. Accessed November 16, 2019. http://www.rebuildbydesign.org/our-work/sandy-projects.
 “Living Breakwaters.” REGENERATING TOTTENVILLE. Accessed November 18, 2019. https://www.regeneratingtottenville.org/living-breakwaters-project.
 “Living Breakwaters Design and Implementation.” SCAPE. Accessed November 18, 2019. https://www.scapestudio.com/projects/living-breakwaters-design-implementation/.
 Melcher, Henry. “Rebuild By Design> SCAPE's Living Breakwaters Transform Staten Island's South Shore.” Archpaper.com, April 9, 2014. https://archpaper.com/2014/04/rebuild-by-design-scapes-living-breakwaters-transform-staten-islands-south-shore/.
 “Tottenville Shoreline Protection Project.” Tottenville Shoreline Protection Project | Governor's Office of Storm Recovery (GOSR). Accessed November 18, 2019. 	https://stormrecovery.ny.gov/tottenville-shoreline-protection-project.
 “Visualizing The Living Breakwaters at Conference House Park.” Rebuild by Design. Accessed November 19, 2019. http://www.rebuildbydesign.org/news-and-events/press/visualizing-the-living-breakwaters-at-conference-house-park.

External links 

 Flood articles – BBC News
 Flood defence works in Wiltshire – BBC
 Flood defence works in Carlisle – BBC
 Flood management and restoration of habitats – BBC

 
Control
Water management